This article displays a list of the England national rugby union team's tours and series. The list includes all tours and series involving a rugby union team that represented the whole of England and was officially sanctioned by the Rugby Football Union (RFU).

List of England tours and series

Notes

 
tours and series
tours and series